Naldini is a surname. Notable people with the surname include:

Giovanni Battista Naldini (1535–1591), Italian painter
Nico Naldini (born 1929), Italian novelist, poet and film director
Paolo Naldini (1632–1713), Italian Roman Catholic bishop
Pietro Paolo Naldini (1619–1691), Italian sculptor